Nigel James Donnelly (born 7 July 1968) is a New Zealand cyclist, who won a gold medal representing his country at the 1990 Commonwealth Games. He also competed at the 1988 Summer Olympics and the 1992 Summer Olympics.

Early life and family
Donnelly was born in Christchurch on 7 July 1968, the son of Edward Ernest and Margaret Lucy Donnelly, and was educated at Burnside High School. In 1993, he married Lyndal Maria Smith.

Cycling career
Donnelly represented New Zealand at the 1986 World Junior Cycling Championships. He went on to compete for New Zealand in the men's 4000 m team pursuit at two Olympic Games. At Seoul in 1988, he was a member of the team that placed 14th, while at Barcelona in 1992, the New Zealand men's pursuit team finished in seventh place. He competed in the same event at the 1990 Commonwealth Games in Auckland, winning the gold medal with Gary Anderson, Glen McLeay and Stuart Williams.

Honours and awards
In 1990, Donnelly was awarded the New Zealand 1990 Commemoration Medal.

References

External links
 

1968 births
Living people
New Zealand male cyclists
Olympic cyclists of New Zealand
Cyclists at the 1988 Summer Olympics
Cyclists at the 1992 Summer Olympics
Cyclists from Christchurch
Commonwealth Games medallists in cycling
Commonwealth Games gold medallists for New Zealand
Cyclists at the 1990 Commonwealth Games
20th-century New Zealand people
Medallists at the 1990 Commonwealth Games